Schefflera roxburghii is a species of plant in the family Araliaceae. It is endemic to India.

The Latin specific epithet roxburghii refers to the Scottish Botanist William Roxburgh.

References

roxburghii
Flora of the Indian subcontinent
Least concern plants
Taxonomy articles created by Polbot